John McLeay is the name of two generations of Australian politicians:

 John McLeay Sr., Liberal MP 1949–1966
 John McLeay Jr., Liberal MP 1966–1981